Kumki is a 2012 Indian Tamil-language musical adventure romantic drama film written and directed by Prabhu Solomon. It was presented by N. Lingusamy and produced by N. Subash Chandra Bose, under the banner Thirrupathi Brothers, and distributed by K. E. Gnanavel Raja under the banner Studio Green. It features Vikram Prabhu, making his acting debut, while Lakshmi Menon, Thambi Ramaiah and Ashvin Raja appear in other prominent roles.

The story revolves around a mahout and his trained Kumki elephant, who is used to guide other wild animals to minimize the destruction of properties and fields of nearby villages. Filming took place in various places of Karnataka and Kerala. The film's music is composed by D. Imman, in which his soundtrack was commended by the audience and critics. The cinematography was handled by M. Sukumar and editing was handled by L. V. K. Dass. Kumki was released on 14 December 2012.

The film opened to positive reviews from critics, praising the performances of Prabhu and Menon, the direction, and the film's soundtrack. It was a commercial success at the box office. The film won three awards at the 60th Filmfare Awards South, including Best Supporting Actor for Thambi Ramaiah, Best Music Director for D. Imman, Best Lyricist for Yugabharathi. The film won 7 prizes at the Tamil Nadu State Film Awards held in 2017. The film also won two Vijay Awards, three SIIMA Awards and three Ananda Vikatan Cinema Awards.

Plot
The film starts with an introduction to the main characters: the protagonist Bomman (Vikram Prabhu), his pet elephant Manickam, his uncle Kothali (Thambi Ramaiah), and his sidekick Undiyal (Ashvin Raja). Bomman spends most of his time with Manickam and earns his livelihood by hiring it out for festivals in temples and wedding celebrations. Meanwhile, in a village dominated by old principles, a rogue elephant (Komban) ravages crops and ambushes its people. Frustrated by this and without any help from the forest officers, their leader decides to bring a kumki elephant to tame Komban. Bomman and his crew reach the village as placeholders to stay for a couple of days until the real mahout and kumki elephant arrive. Life begins to change for Bomman when he falls in love with Alli (Lakshmi Menon), the daughter of the village leader. She is at first reluctant keeping in mind the village's principles but she soon starts to fall for Bomman. Life goes on smoothly, until Komban starts randomly attacking the village. On the eve of their departure, Komban attacks Manickam. Komban's actions kill Kothali and Undiyal and injures Bomman. In the ensuing fight between Manickam and Komban, Manickam kills Komban but suffers serious injuries and dies. Bomman then cries out loud, regretting that his love had led to the death of his crew and Manickam. Alli's father then recognizes that Alli and Bomman are in love. The film then ends abruptly, leaving Bomman's fate to the viewer's imagination.

Cast

 Vikram Prabhu as Bomman, a Mahout
 Jeffin as young Bomman
 Chemmarappally Manikyam as Manickam (Elephant)
 Lakshmi Menon as Alli
 Thambi Ramaiah as Kothalli
 Ashvin Raja as Undiyal
 Joe Malloori as Maathayaan
 Sreejith Ravi as Forest Officer
 Junior Balaiah
 Yaar Kannan
 Munnar Ramesh

Production

Development 

In a December 2012 interview to Nikhil Raghavan of The Hindu, Prabhu Solomon felt that the success of his previous film Mynaa was because by producing and directing the film, it helped him have creative freedom and pay more attention to detail. He realised that Kumki would be a bigger venture and that he "didn’t want anything to go wrong." At that time, director N. Lingusamy and N. Subash Chandrabose, owners of the production company Thirrupathi Brothers offered to bankroll the film, much to Solomon's delight.

Casting 
Solomon wanted a new face for the role of Bomman, for which over 60 auditions were held. Vikram Prabhu, who participated in the auditions, was selected. Vikram had earlier worked as an assistant director for films like Sarvam (2009) and Aasal (2010).

Filming 
The film which was earlier titled as Komban, was shot across the forests of Kerala and Karnataka. The film was shot at athirappalli falls and Munnar. Later, some scenes were shot in Kerala in dense jungles as well as at Jog Falls and on the Orissa border. For the climax portion, producers bought two-acres of land to shoot a scene where elephants destroy the land. Solomon shot the film mostly during the day, especially in morning and evening time, to create the right feel for the scenes. Solomon also wished to explore his love of nature through Kumki. The elephant, Manickam, was around 12 feet tall.

Themes and influences 
Malathi Rangarajan of The Hindu compared the film's similarities to M. G. Ramachandran's Nalla Neram (1972) and Rajinikanth's Annai Oru Aalayam (1979) in terms of the protagonist's relationship with elephants.

Music

The soundtrack album and background score is composed by D. Imman, in his third collaboration with Prabhu Solomon after Lee (2007) and Mynaa (2010). The album has seven numbers written by Yugabharathi with three karaoke versions. The soundtrack album was released by Sony Music on 1 August 2012, which coincided with an audio launch event held at Sathyam Cinemas in Chennai, where Rajinikanth, Kamal Haasan and Suriya, amongst other celebrities in the film's cast and crew, participated in the function. Kamal Haasan unveiled the audio CD and handed the first copy of the album to Rajinikanth and Suriya.

The soundtrack album received mostly positive reviews from critics as well as audience. Behindwoods gave the album a rating of 3.5 out of 5 and stated  "The Imman - Prabu Solomon combo has come up with another huge winner. There are tasteful melodies spread across the album while one nice foot tapping number is there as well". Indiaglitz gave 3 out of 5 and summarised "All the 10 numbers make 'Kumki' a jumbo album". Milliblog gave a comment "Imman is firmly consolidating his form through Kumki!" Music Aloud gave 7 out of 10 to the album and stated "Couple of damp squibs, but otherwise impressive soundtrack from D Imman."

Release
The film's distribution rights were acquired by K. E. Gnanavel Raja, under his banner Studio Green. The film was initially scheduled to release on 13 November 2012, coinciding with Diwali, but due to post-production works and also due to the release of Vijay-starrer Thuppakki and Silambarasan-starrer Podaa Podi, the release was postponed to 14 December 2012. Kumki along with Gautham Vasudev Menon's Neethaane En Ponvasantham, were scheduled to release on the same day. Both becoming the most anticipated films of the year, because of the success of the soundtrack. On 1 December, the makers confirmed the release date on the said before date. Two days before the release of Kumki along with Neethaane En Ponvasantham, the advanced bookings for the first weekend were sold out. The film was dubbed in Telugu as Gajaraju, and was released simultaneously on the same date. Post-release, the makers has shot three climax scenes and planned to change the tragic climax with an alternate positive climax of the film, as the audiences were not happy over the film's ending. However, the climax of the film remained unchanged.

Reception

Critical reception
Kumki received critical acclaim. Malathi Rangarajan of The Hindu praised the performances of Vikram and Menon, noting that while Vikram "makes an impact with effective underplay", Menon showed "apt expressions"; she found Ramaiah's dialogues to be a bit "contrived" after a certain point of time. Oneindia gave 3 out of 5 saying that while the movie is at times "dragging", the subject makes it an "engaging affair although the climax is predictable". Behindwoods also gave the film 3 out of 5 saying that "Kumki definitely lives up to the hype. It is a beautifully shot movie with good performances and an emotional core". The Times of India rated 3.5 out of 5 to the movie and stated "Prabu Solomon’s ode to love in the times of elephant attacks, holds a lot of promise but sadly flatters only to deceive." Pavithra Srinivasan of Rediff gave 3.5 out of 5 and stated "Kumki is an unforgettable ride through the wilds of Tamil Nadu's virgin forests." Deccan Herald gave the film 3.5 out of 5 and summarised that "Kumki may not be the year's best film, but definitely can't be looked down upon." Bollywoodlife stated "Prabhu Solomon has come up with a neat entertainer, though the slow pace hampers proceedings at some places."

Box office
Kumki was made with the budget of 5 crores. The film was a success at the box office. The film grossed 10 crore in 3 days. The film grossed more than 40 crore at the box office. The film got Super Hit status at the box office.

Awards and nominations

Sequel  
In early 2016, Prabhu Solomon confirmed to the media that he would soon start work on a sequel the film's sequel Kumki 2. This sequel will feature newcomers in lead roles similar to the first part. He then delayed the project to finish his commitments to the Dhanush-starrer, Thodari (2016), while also contemplating potentially remaking Kumki into Hindi. Following the disappointing response to Thodari, Prabhu Solomon chose to finish scripting the sequel to Kumki and registered the title Yaanai for a production for Eros International during the final quarter 2016. He went on a recce to Thailand to finalise the script and hunt for locations.

Prabhu Solomon confirmed in July 2017 that pre-production was almost complete and the team were waiting for the end of the monsoon season to begin the shoot of the film in Thailand. He stated that debutants would feature in the lead role, and subsequently signed Mathi, the nephew of director Lingusamy to play the male lead. Mathi's earlier film, Balaji Sakthivel's Ra Ra Rajasekhar, remains unreleased as a result of Linguswamy's financial problems. Debutant Shrita Rao will starring as the female lead in the movie. Pen India Limited took over as producers and Ajay–Atul replaced D. Imman, before the start of the shoot in August 2017 in Thailand.

Main production ended in mid 2018. Dubbing of the film was recorded during and after the COVID-19 pandemic in May 2020.

Notes

References

External links
 

2012 films
2010s Tamil-language films
Films about elephants
Films shot in Karnataka
Indian drama films
Films scored by D. Imman
Elephants in India
Films shot in Munnar
Films set in forests
Films directed by Prabhu Solomon